Hiroyuki Kanno may refer to:

Hiroyuki Kanno (game designer), Japanese game designer
Hiroyuki Kanno (martial artist), Japanese martial artist
Hiroyuki Kanno (jurist), associate Justice of the Supreme Court of Japan